The Juncus subnodulosus–Cirsium palustre fen-meadow is a plant association characteristically found on damp ground in portions of western Europe.  This type of fen-meadow appears to have co-evolved with human agriculture in Europe since the earlier Holocene.

Species
The dominant flora species within this fen-meadow are:
Juncus subnodulosus and
Cirsium palustre.

The Juncus subnodulosus-Cirsium palustre fen-meadow association typically has the following species present: 
Filipendula ulmaria,
Equisetum palustre,
Holcus lanatus,
Lotus pedunculatus
Mentha aquatica.

References
 C. Michael Hogan. 2009. Marsh Thistle: Cirsium palustre, GlobalTwitcher.com, ed. N. Strömberg
 J.S. Rodwell. 1998. British Plant Communities 640 pages

Line notes

Habitats
Grasslands
Wetlands
.
British National Vegetation Classification mire communities